John Thomas Hackett,  (June 12, 1884 – September 15, 1956) was a lawyer and political figure in Quebec. He represented Stanstead in the House of Commons of Canada from 1930 to 1935 and from 1945 to 1949 as a Conservative and then as a Progressive Conservative member. He sat for the Victoria division in the Senate of Canada from 1955 to 1956.

He was born in Stanstead, Quebec, the son of Michael Felix Hackett and Florence Alberta Knight, and was educated at St. Charles Seminary and the law school at McGill University. In 1912, he married Linda Harding. Hackett served as a member of the board of governors for McGill University.  He was Batonnier of the Bar Association of Montreal and also President of the Canadian Bar Association, from 1947 to 1948. He was also president of the Stanstead County Historical Society and a lieutenant in the militia.

In 1948, while serving as the President of the Canadian Bar Association and MP for Stanstead, Hackett spoke in the House of Commons against a proposal that the position of chief commissioner of the Board of Transport Commissioners be designated as open only to a judge of the Exchequer Court of Canada.  Hackett was concerned that the proposal would blur the lines between the quasi-political and policy role of the Board, compared to the traditional neutrality of judges, and could undermine popular respect for the judiciary as neutral arbiters.

Hackett died in office at the age of 72.

Electoral record

References

External links 
 
 Hackett family fonds, Eastern Townships Reference Centre
 John Thomas Hackett, Archives de Montréal

1884 births
1956 deaths
Lawyers in Quebec
Canadian King's Counsel
Canadian Bar Association Presidents
Conservative Party of Canada (1867–1942) MPs
Progressive Conservative Party of Canada MPs
Members of the House of Commons of Canada from Quebec
Canadian senators from Quebec
McGill University Faculty of Law alumni